Khirbet Zanuta is a Palestinian village in the Hebron Governorate in the southern West Bank, located 20 kilometers south of Hebron. Nearby localities include ad-Dhahiriya to the northwest and Khirbet Shweika to the northwest,  as well as two Israeli settlements, Teneh Omarim to the west and Shim'a to the east. The Meitarim industrial zone just to its east was built for the settlers. The village is adjacent to the Green Line.

According to the Palestinian Central Bureau of Statistics (PCBS), Khirbet Zanuta had a population of 60 in the 2007 census. By 2013 it had 130 residents, a large increase from 1997 when six residents were recorded. The four principal families are the as-Samamera, al-Tel, al-Batat and al-Qaysiyah. In 2012 the number of families registered at Zanuta was 27.

There are no schools, health care facilities or pharmacies in Khirbet Zanuta and residents travel 10 kilometers to ad-Dhahiriya to obtain those services. Agriculture is the main economic activity, employing most of the village's working residents. The total land area is approximately 12,000 dunams, of which roughly 3,000 are cultivated, mostly with field crops. Much of the remaining land area is considered "open spaces," while one dunam is classified as built-up areas. Israeli authorities are pressing the residents to leave.

History
Pottery shards at Zanuta indicate continuous settlement since the Iron Age, and archeologist Avi Ofer has proposed an identification of the site with Dana in the fifth group of Judean cities in the south Hebron hills. Some of the ruins apparently dated to Byzantine period, but there was also signs of the recent destruction of a village. Byzantine pottery has been found in the village.

French explorer and amateur archaeologist Victor Guérin passed through the area in 1863, and described its ruins, which were strewn over the summit and flanks of the hill. He found:

Numerous tumbled-down houses, of average size, that had mostly been built in earlier times from regularly cut stones, nearly all of which enclosed a cave drilled out of the rockface; cisterns lay around on all sides, and there was a pool (birket) dug partially from the rock, and partially built from stone, measuring 20 by 17 paces. There were also traces of an ancient mosque, constructed, particularly in its corners, with magnificent masonry that had no doubt been harvested from a Christian basilica ... Not to be overlooked also were the remains of a small freestone structure, with all the appearance of a sanctuary, perhaps a mausoleum dating back to the Roman period.  All that survives of it is a section of wall rising from the bedrock and embellished with two pilasters between which one can see a vaulted niche touched off with elegant mouldings and probably designed to house a small statue.

The place was also surveyed in 1874, and extensive ruins were found, including the remains of a "good-sized mosque."

Zanuta was a cave settlement of local peoples predating both the foundation of Israel (1948) and Israel's occupation of the West Bank after the Six-Day War in 1967, and archaeological studies attest to continuous habitation at the site from the Byzantine to the Ottoman period, when it eventually dwindled to "a settlement of shepherds and fellahs living in the remains of the ancient structures and the residential caves alongside them," of families that, according to Shuli Hartman, came to the caves from the nearby town of ad-Dhahiriya in the early 20th century. David Grossman writes it was a large cave settlement in the early 1800s. When the caves became uninhabitable in the 1980s, the villagers built stone houses with tin and plastic roofs to dwell in, and kept external pens and the caves as shelters for their sheep.

Moves to demolish the village
In 2007, Zanuta residents, assisted by the Association for Civil Rights in Israel, filed a joint petition to the High Court of Justice asking that the Civil Administration provide them with a complete construction plan. As a result of the petition they received an interim order from the court. In 2011, an Israeli NGO Regavim, whose objective, according to Hass is 'to protect what it calls national (Jewish) land and to demolish Palestinian structures built without a permit,' revived the case, filing an amicus curiae request, at which the state of Israel then submitted a full reply to the Zanuta villagers' petition.

As one of a dozen villages in the South Hebron Hills, Zanuta has been slated for demolition by the IDF, and the villagers are to be expelled from Area C of the West Bank to areas under Palestinian authority (Area A or Area B). The Israeli civil administration claims that the demolition order is related to the fact that it lies directly over an archeological site recognized under the British mandate, and therefore regularisation of their village structures is ruled out. Archeologist Avi Ofer, who did his doctoral research on the area, has expressed astonishment at the extent of the area -120 dunams (30 acres), - defined as the "Zanuta archaeology site" by the Civil Administration. In his view the real site covers half or less that size.

To The Guardian one shepherd stated: "We have no choice but to be here, this is how we were raised and this is how we live,"... "The only thing we know how to do is raise sheep. We can only do that here.”

According to Amira Hass, while calling for the demolition of Palestinian villages, Israeli authorities have approved construction in Jewish settlements on more imposing archaeological sites, such as the settlement at Tel Rumeida in Hebron, or in Jerusalem itself. The state declared that the military were not obliged to find a solution for the villagers, and demands that they be moved out to ad-Dhahiriya. In response to petitions by the villagers, the High Court has ruled that the state had 30 days to find a solution to the impasse either by providing permits or making appropriate arrangements for the villagers.

On 29 August 2012 the Israeli governing authority in the West Bank destroyed two cisterns, some used to catch rainfall, used by Khirbet Zanuta shepherds and farmers. Three others were destroyed at nearby Khirbet Anizat. Together they lost five sheepfolds, two tents, a tin shack and two improvised food storage sheds. According to Khirbet Zanuta residents one of the cisterns was hundreds of years old. Some of the cisterns were created with the assistance of a Polish NGO.

Notes

References

Bibliography

External links
Welcome To Khirbat Zanuta
Survey of Western Palestine, Map 25:     IAA, Wikimedia commons
 Khirbet Zanuta Village, Fact Sheet, from  Applied Research Institute–Jerusalem (ARIJ)
Khirbet Zanuta Profile, from ARIJ
Aerial photo, from ARIJ
The priorities and needs for development in Khirbet Zanuta village based on the community and local authorities’ assessment, from ARIJ

Villages in the West Bank